Private School Athletic League is a high school athletic conference that is part of the CIF Central Coast Section of the California Interscholastic Federation.    It comprises 16 small private and/or charter high schools generally between San Jose and San Francisco along the San Francisco Peninsula.

Members
 Pacific Bay Christian School
 Downtown College Prep
 Jewish Community High School of the Bay
 Kehillah Jewish High School
 KIPP San Jose Collegiate
 Latino College Preparatory Academy
 Liberty Baptist School
 Mid-Peninsula High School
 Mountain View Academy
 North Valley Baptist
 The Nueva School
 San Francisco Christian School
 St. Lawrence Academy High School (closed)
 Summit Preparatory Charter High School
 Summit Shasta Charter School (Daly City)
 Thomas More School
 University Preparatory Academy
 Design Tech High School

References

CIF Central Coast Section